Heringen (Werra) is a small town in Hersfeld-Rotenburg district in eastern Hesse, Germany lying right at the boundary with Thuringia.

Geography

Location 
The nearest major towns and cities are Bad Hersfeld (28 km to the west), Eisenach (30 km to the northeast) and Kassel (80 km to the north).
The town lies on the river Werra, surrounded by outliers of the Thuringian Forest, the Seulingswald and the Anterior Rhön, all mountain or hill ranges.

The lowest point in town is found on the Werra floodplain at 210 m above sea level. The highest point within town limits is the Lehnberg at 471 m above sea level.

Neighbouring communities 
Clockwise from the north, these are Wildeck, Verwaltungsgemeinschaft Berka/Werra, Philippsthal (Werra) und Friedewald.

Constituent communities 
Heringen's Stadtteile, besides the main centre, also called Heringen, are Bengendorf, Herfa, Kleinensee, Leimbach, Lengers, Widdershausen and Wölfershausen.

History 

In 1153, Heringen had its first documentary mention. The Fulda Abbey enfeoffed the nobleman Heinrich von Heringen about 1170 with the place. The Heringen court comprised in the early 15th century not only the current town area but also the Thuringian centres of Vitzeroda, Gasteroda and Abteroda, all of which now belong to the Verwaltungsgemeinschaft Berka/Werra. In 1432, Margarethe von Heringen sold the court to the Landgraves of Hesse, thereby binding Heringen to Hesse.

With the opening of the Wintershall potash works, which began mining in 1903, the community got its first industrial jobs. Later, the Neu-Heringen and Herfa-Neurode potash mines were built. The mine is today the world's biggest potash-mining area and has an area about the same as Greater Munich's.

At the end of World War II, the libraries of the German Army's Military Geology Unit (Wehrgeologenstellen) and the German Patent Office (Reichspatentamt) were removed from Berlin and secretly stored in the deep Wintershall potash mine in Heringen. There they were discovered by the US Third Army in March 1945, and removed to the US. The German Patent Library was later restored to Germany, but the military geology materials of maps, reports and books, often stolen from other countries during the invasions, were retained by the US as Nazi materiel.  Most of these maps and books remain in the US Geological Survey Library today, with an obscure United States Army Corps of Engineers stamp on each that reads "Heringen Collection".

Market rights were granted the community in 1526, and in 1977 came town rights to what was then a greater community (formed out of several smaller former communities).

There are also successor buildings of the knightly estate of Vultejus.

Amalgamations 
Between 1968 and 1972 the above-named centres were amalgamated into a greater community, which was granted town rights in 1977 by the Hesse Land government.

Population development

Politics

Town council 

The municipal election held on 26 March 2006 yielded the following results:

The town's executive (Magistrat) is made up of six councillors, with two seats allotted to the SPD, two to the CDU and 2 to the WGH. Manfred Wenk is the first ever WGH councillor.

Mayor 
Mayor Daniel Iliev was elected on 20 March 2016.

Coat of arms 
The town's arms might be described thus: Azure a bend wavy sinister argent between a sledgehammer and a cross-peen hammer per saltire, and three fish of the last.

The bend wavy sinister, that is, slanted wavy stripe beginning on the sinister (armsbearer's left, viewer's right) side and stretching down across the escutcheon, stands for the river Werra. The three fish come from the arms formerly borne by the Lords of Heringen (Hering is German for “herring”). The mining tools are, of course, a traditional miner's symbol. This charge was added to the coat of arms in 2003, as potash had been being mined here for a hundred years. The old arms are shown at right.

Town partnerships 
 Rombas, Moselle, France

In 2007, partnership documents were signed with the following towns:
 Heringen, Thuringia
 Odolanów, Ostrów Wielkopolski, Poland

Culture and sightseeing

Museums 
 Werra-Kalibergbaumuseum (potash mining museum)

Buildings 
 Potash tailings heap “Monte Kali” (Heringen “landmark”)
 Walterskirche church ruins (from a village thought to have been forsaken in the 15th century)
 Bodesruh memorial (tower, originally built as a monument to German division)
 Successor buildings of the knightly estate of Vultejus

Parks 
 Rohrlache and Säulingssee (wetlands on the Werra floodplain)
 Herfa forest botany garden

Regular events 
 Weekly market (Thursday mornings)

Economy and infrastructure

Research and development 
It was in Heringen that the groundbreaking invention of the electrostatic salt separation facility (elektrostatische Salz-Trennungsanlage, or ESTA) was first realized and further developed. After former mining director Prof. Dr.-Ing. Arno Singewald's research and inventions, the German potash-mining industry could introduce a thoroughly novel, environmentally friendly means of processing the mined salts. Salt-saturated water is avoided when the ESTA is used. These facilities built at the potash works along the Werra have also seen to it that a river that was once thoroughly salted – by East German potash works – has been brought back to life.

Established businesses 
 K+S Kali GmbH – potash mining (district's biggest employer)
 Schwabenhaus GmbH + Co. KG – prefabricated buildings
 Messer Industriemontagen & Apparatebau GmbH – pipeline and special steel construction

Notable people 
 Uwe Bein (b. 26 September 1960 in Heringen), professional footballer and world champion in 1990
 Jürgen Gehb (b. 9 August 1952 in Heringen), since 1998 Member of the Bundestag and currently rightwing speaker of the CDU/CSU Bundestag faction.
 Michael Roth (b. 24 August 1970 in Heringen), German SPD politician and Member of the Bundestag

References

Bibliography 
Hadden, Robert Lee. 2003. "The Heringen Collection of the US Geological Survey Library" Geological Society of America. Seattle Annual Meeting (November 2–5, 2003). Paper No. 94-7. Abstract: "One special collection of German, Polish and Russian language books, maps and reports in the US Geological Survey Library has an interesting and unusual history. The “Heringen Collection” came from Nazi Germany. In the last days of the war, these maps, photos and other records were sent from the Military Geology offices in Berlin to the safety of a deep potash mineshaft in Heringen (Werra), in Hessen, Germany. A special group of US Army soldiers were ordered to find these lost records of the Third Reich. When found and removed from the Heringen mine, those records which dealt with the earth sciences, terrain analysis, military geology and other geological matters were sent to the USGS, and eventually came to reside at the USGS Library. The printed papers and books were mostly incorporated into our main collection, but a significant portion of the materials were never cataloged, calendared or indexed. This paper describes the history of the USGS Library's “Heringen Collection,” and some overview of the scope of the materials."
Hadden, Robert Lee. 2008. "The Heringen Collection of the US Geological Survey Library of Reston, Virginia." Earth Sciences History, Volume 27, Number 2. Pages 242-265. . Abstract: "A special collection of German, Polish, and Russian language books, maps and reports in the US Geological Survey Library has an interesting and unusual history. The so-called ‘Heringen Collection’ came from Nazi Germany. Many of these items were captured from libraries, offices and even private homes as the German Army advanced into neighboring countries. In the last days of the war, these maps, reports, photos and other records were sent from the Military Geology offices in Berlin to the safety of a deep potash mineshaft in Heringen (Werra), in Hessen, Germany. A group of US Army soldiers found these lost records of the Third Reich. When removed from the Heringen mine, those records that dealt with the earth sciences, terrain analysis, military geology and other geological matters were sent to the USGS, and eventually came to reside at the USGS Library. The printed papers and books were mostly incorporated into the main collection, but a portion of the materials have never been cataloged, calendared or indexed. These materials have many current uses, including projects of value to citizens in their nations of origin."
Willig, Dierk. 2009. "Die Odyssee des Wehrgeologenarchivs als Teil der Heringen Collection: Versuch einer Rekonstruktion der Vorgänge von März 1945 bis heute." Euskirchen: Amt für Geoinformationswesen der Bundeswehr. 31 pages.

External links 
  

Hersfeld-Rotenburg